Middle grade fiction is fiction intended for children between the ages of 8 and 12.  While these books are sometimes grouped together with books for other age bands and called collectively "children's books", middle grade is distinct from, and is intended for older audiences than, picture books, early/easy readers, and chapter books (which have larger print and more illustrations). Most of the winners of the Newbery Medal have been middle grade books.

The category beyond middle grade is young adult (YA), which is for ages 12–18.  In addition to differences in word count and the age of the protagonists, middle grade and YA differ in content.  Middle grade works don't include profanity, graphic violence, or sexuality, and they tend to focus on the characters' friends, family, and immediate surroundings as opposed to the world beyond their friends and family.

Examples of middle grade fiction include Charlotte's Web by E. B. White, the Percy Jackson and the Olympians series by Rick Riordan, and the early Harry Potter books.

References

Children's literature
Fiction